Sarsaru (also Romanized as Sarsārū; also known as Sarsārūd) is a village in Sangan Rural District, in the Central District of Khash County, Sistan and Baluchestan Province, Iran. At the 2006 census, its population was 115, in 40 families.

References 

Populated places in Khash County